The lex Aufeia was a Roman law, known only from a passage of Aulus Gellius, giving an account of  part a speech against the law by Gaius Gracchus. The author of the law is unknown.

The law has been interpreted as a ratification of  Manius Aquilius' Asian settlement. However, nothing in the passage supports this assessment. The passage indicates that the law applied to Asia since Mithridates and Nicomedes were respectively supporting and opposing it. It is probable that Gracchus was trying to reserve land for Roman taxation rather than have the revenues go to Mithridates.

See also
Asia (Roman province)
List of Roman laws
Roman Law

References

Roman law
2nd century BC in the Roman Republic